ICRA Limited (ICRA) is an Indian independent and professional investment information and credit rating agency. The company was established in 1991, and was originally named Investment Information and Credit Rating Agency of India Limited (IICRA India).

It was a joint-venture between Moody's and various Indian commercial banks and financial services companies. The company changed its name to ICRA Limited, and went public on 13 April 2007, with a listing on the Bombay Stock Exchange and the National Stock Exchange. As of end December 2020, Moody's Corporation owns a 51.86% majority stake.

ICRA Credit Rating

ICRA's credit ratings are symbolic representations of its current opinion on the relative credit risks associated with the rated debt obligations/issues. These ratings are assigned on an Indian (that is, national or local) credit rating scale for Indian Rupee denominated debt obligations. ICRA ratings may be understood as relative rankings of credit risk within India. ICRA ratings are not designed to enable any rating comparison among instruments across countries; rather, these address the relative credit risks within India.

ICRA's ratings (other than Structured Finance Ratings) in the investment grade convey the relative likelihood of default, i.e., the possibility of the debt obligation not being met as promised. All other ratings, including Structured Finance Ratings, reflect both the probability of default and the severity of loss on default, i.e., the expected loss against the rated debt obligation.

Credit ratings aside, ICRA also assigns Corporate Governance Ratings, besides Performance Ratings, Gradings and Rankings to mutual funds, construction companies and hospitals.

Group Companies
As of August 2020, ICRA Ltd. operates the following subsidiaries:

 ICRA Lanka Limited (ICRA Lanka) – credit rating agency licensed by the Securities and Exchange Commission of Sri Lanka (SEC) incorporated in December 2010 and was granted license by the SEC in May 2011.
 ICRA Nepal Limited (ICRA Nepal) – first Credit Rating Agency in Nepal incorporated on 11 November 2011 and granted licence by the Securities Board of Nepal (SEBON) on 3 October 2012.
 ICRA Analytics Limited – analytics and digital platforms for risk management, market data, consulting and knowledge services. ICRA Analytics was formed from the merger of ICRA Online Limited (ICRON) and ICRA Management Consulting Services Limited (IMaCS) in October 2019.

The following business formerly were part of the ICRA Group of Companies:

 PT ICRA Indonesia (ICRAIndo) – ICRA pulled out of the Indonesia market in June 2015.
 ICRA Techno Analytics Limited (ICTEAS) – ICTEAS was acquired by Pune-based global consulting and IT services solutions integrations company Nihilent Technologies in August 2016 for INR 687.5 million (US$10 million) and renamed Nihilent Analytics.

References

Credit rating agencies in India
Companies based in Gurgaon
Indian companies established in 1991
1991 establishments in Haryana
Companies listed on the National Stock Exchange of India
Companies listed on the Bombay Stock Exchange